Ding Dong! is the debut studio album by Finnish Pop singer Krista Siegfrids. The album was released in Finland on 10 May 2013 by Universal Music Finland. The first single from the album was "Marry Me" and it was released on 1 January 2013. The album peaked at number 19 on the Finnish Albums Chart.

Critical reception
The album drew comparisons to the music of Katy Perry and Ke$ha. James Sayer of ESC Views reviewed the album, describing it as being "full of the same quirky, high-octane pop that has quickly characterized Krista's musical style".

Commercial performance
The album entered the Finnish Albums Chart at number 24, it climbed to number 19 in its second week. The album spent five weeks in the chart, peaking at number 19.

Singles
 "Marry Me" was released as the lead single from the album on 1 January 2013. She performed the song at the Eurovision Song Contest 2013, in the Semi-final she finished 9th and scored 64 points and in the Final she finished 24th and scored 13 points.
 "Amen!" was released as the second single from the album.
"Can You See Me" was released as the third single on 30 September 2013.

Track listing

Chart performance

Weekly charts

Release history

References

2013 debut albums